Jone Macilai may refer to:

 Jone Macilai (rugby league) (born 1983), a Fijian rugby league player
 Jone Macilai-Tori (born 1990), a Fijian rugby union player